The Chinese Bungalow, also known as Chinese Den, is a 1940 British drama film directed by George King and starring Kay Walsh, Jane Baxter and Paul Lukas. It was adapted from the 1925 play The Chinese Bungalow by Marion Osmond and James Corbett. King was a former producer of quota quickies who was increasingly working on films with better budgets during the early war years.

It was made at Beaconsfield Studios.

Cast
 Paul Lukas as Yuan Sing
 Kay Walsh as Sadie Merivale
 Jane Baxter as Charlotte Merivale
 Robert Douglas as Richard Marquess
 Wallace Douglas as Harold Marquess
 Jerry Verno as Stubbins
 Mayura as Ayah
 John Salew as Mr. Lum
 James Woodburn as Dr. Cameron

References

Bibliography
 Chibnall, Steve & McFarlane, Brian. The British 'B' Film. Palgrave MacMillan, 2009.

External links

The Chinese Bungalow film on Internet Archive

1940 films
1940 drama films
Films directed by George King
British drama films
Films shot at Beaconsfield Studios
Films based on British novels
Films scored by Jack Beaver
British black-and-white films
1940s English-language films
1940s British films